Jono Jenkins (born 26 May 1986 in Sydney, Australia) is a rugby union footballer. He plays for the RC Narbonne in Pro D2 having previously represented the Waratahs. His regular playing position is openside flanker. Jenkins was educated at Saint Ignatius' College, Riverview in Sydney.

He made his senior debut for the Force during the 2010 Super 14 season against the Reds.

References

External links
 Waratahs player profile
 itsrugby.co.uk profile

Rugby union flankers
Living people
Australian rugby union players
1986 births
Rugby union players from Sydney
New South Wales Waratahs players
Western Force players
Australian expatriate rugby union players
Expatriate rugby union players in France
Australian expatriate sportspeople in France